Dylan Gray Crews (born February 26, 2002) is an American college baseball outfielder for the LSU Tigers.

Crews was born and raised in the Central Florida region and attended Lake Mary High School, where he played four years of varsity baseball. He was considered a top Major League Baseball (MLB) draft prospect out of high school but withdrew himself from consideration to attend LSU. In his first year at the school, Crews ranked highly in several Southeastern Conference hitting leaderboards and received media honors. He was a consensus first-team All-American and was named co-SEC Player of the Year in his sophomore year. Crews spent two years with the United States national collegiate baseball team.

Crews is considered a top prospect for the 2023 Major League Baseball draft, with MLB.com and other media outlets projecting him to be selected first overall.

Early life
Crews attended Lake Mary High School in Lake Mary, Florida. During his amateur career, he played for USA Baseball twice, once on their 14U team and once on their 18U team that won a gold medal. As a junior in 2019, he batted .389 with 15 stolen bases. That summer, he played in the Under Armour All-America Baseball Game at Wrigley Field. Although his senior season in 2020 was cut short due to the COVID-19 pandemic, he was considered a top prospect for the 2020 Major League Baseball draft. However, he withdrew his name a week before, announcing he would fulfill his commitment to play college baseball at Louisiana State University.

College career
Crews immediately became LSU's starting right fielder as a freshman in 2021. He started 63 games during the season, batting .362 with 18 home runs, 42 RBIs, 16 doubles, and 12 stolen bases. His 18 home runs were the most ever by a LSU freshman, surpassing Mike Fontenot's previous record of 17. He earned All-American honors and was named National Freshman of the Year by Perfect Game. He was named to the United States national baseball team after the season. He also briefly played for the Sanford River Rats of the Florida Collegiate Summer League. In 2022, Crews shifted over to center field. He was named the co-Southeastern Conference Baseball Player of the Year alongside Sonny DiChiara. He finished the season having played in 62 games with a .349/.463/.691 slash line with 22 home runs and 72 RBIs. Following the season's end, he was invited and returned to play with USA Baseball.

Crews is considered a top prospect for the 2023 Major League Baseball draft. The MLB Pipeline ranking on MLB.com listed Crews as the best draft prospect available and projected him to be selected first overall by the Pittsburgh Pirates. Baseball America, FanSided, and Perfect Game also projected Crews to be selected first overall. FanGraphs ranked him as the third-best prospect in the draft.

Player profile
In his MLB.com draft profile, Crews has been described as "a plus hitter with plus power" with a "quick right-handed stroke" but was noted to have a tendency to whiff on changeups. The website also described Crews as an "at least average" outfielder with arm strength, an ability to track fly balls, and a potential to play center field at the major league level.

Crews has been described as a five-tool player. LSU head coach Paul Mainieri credited Crews with a preparedness for the college level that he compared to that of alumni DJ LeMahieu and Alex Bregman.

References

External links
LSU Tigers bio

2002 births
Living people
Baseball players from Florida
Baseball outfielders
Sportspeople from Seminole County, Florida
People from Lake Mary, Florida
LSU Tigers baseball players
United States national baseball team players
All-American college baseball players